"Maveth" is the tenth episode of the third season of the American television series Agents of S.H.I.E.L.D., based on the Marvel Comics organization S.H.I.E.L.D. (Strategic Homeland Intervention, Enforcement and Logistics Division), revolving around the character of Phil Coulson and his team of S.H.I.E.L.D. agents as they fight to stop Hydra from bringing an ancient Inhuman through an alien portal. It is set in the Marvel Cinematic Universe (MCU), sharing continuity with the films of the franchise. The episode was written by Jeffrey Bell, and directed by Vincent Misiano.

Clark Gregg reprises his role as Coulson from the film series, and is joined by series regulars Ming-Na Wen, Brett Dalton, Chloe Bennet, Iain De Caestecker, Elizabeth Henstridge, Nick Blood, Adrianne Palicki, Henry Simmons, and Luke Mitchell.

"Maveth" originally aired on ABC on December 8, 2015, and according to Nielsen Media Research, was watched by 3.85 million viewers.

Plot
Following the events of "Closure", Ward's team find an ancient statue in the shape of the Hydra symbol on Maveth, the deserted planet opened through the Monolith. They also find Will Daniels, and Fitz convinces Ward to let Will guide them through the wasteland to the point where the portal will reopen. Coulson regains consciousness and pursues the team, and after Will leads the Hydra agents into a storm so he and Fitz can escape, Coulson kills the soldiers and wounds Ward, forcing him to help find Fitz and Will.

Back on Earth, Mack leads two teams into the castle to secure the portal and rescue Coulson, Fitz and Simmons, as well as Hydra's captive Inhumans, who have been brought in by Malick. Mack goes with Hunter and Morse, while Daisy goes with May, Lincoln and Joey. Lincoln causes a power failure, during which Simmons escapes and finds the captive Inhumans, including Andrew. She reluctantly releases him to fight the Hydra agents trying to recapture her, but he also murders the other Inhumans. While Mack, Hunter and Morse seize the portal chamber, May finds Simmons and learns of Andrew's escape, and Joey saves Daisy from Giyera by melting 3 bullets, who is incapacitated by Lincoln. Mack orders the other agents to leave and to destroy the castle so that the monster cannot escape Maveth, but Daisy refuses to leave him behind.

Fitz and Will come across the ruins of an ancient civilization, and Will explains that the inhabitants of Maveth 'feared change' and warred among themselves, until they destroyed each other. When Will trips, Fitz stops to help the wound on his leg, only to find its bone exposed. His first-hand knowledge leads Fitz to realize that he is in fact the monster, inhabiting the reanimated body of Will, who actually died saving Simmons from it. "Will" attacks Fitz as Coulson finds them, but when he shoots "Will" several times to save Fitz, Ward attacks him. The castle machinery automatically reopens the portal, and Fitz prevents "Will" from escaping through it by destroying Will's body with a flare gun. Coulson overpowers Ward and crushes his chest with his prosthetic hand, killing him. Returning to Earth through the portal, Coulson and Fitz escape with Mack and Daisy, as May destroys the castle with the Zephyr's missiles. The team return to air base where Simmons hugs Fitz over the loss of Will, and Lincoln kisses Daisy. Coulson shares a look with Fitz, referencing to the death of Ward on Maveth. However, the monster takes over Ward's body and reaches Earth before the portal closes, and is encountered by a fleeing Malick.

Production

Development
In November 2015, Marvel announced that the tenth episode of the season would be titled "Maveth", to be written by executive producer Jeffrey Bell, with Vincent Misiano directing.

Casting

In November 2015, Marvel revealed that main cast members Clark Gregg, Ming-Na Wen, Brett Dalton, Chloe Bennet, Iain De Caestecker, Elizabeth Henstridge, Nick Blood, Adrianne Palicki, Henry Simmons, and Luke Mitchell would star as Phil Coulson, Melinda May, Grant Ward, Daisy Johnson, Leo Fitz, Jemma Simmons, Lance Hunter, Bobbi Morse, Alphonso "Mack" MacKenzie, and Lincoln Campbell, respectively. It was also revealed that the guest cast for the episode would include Blair Underwood as Andrew Garner, Constance Zimmer as Rosalind Price, Juan Pablo Raba as Joey Gutierrez, Powers Boothe as Gideon Malick, Mark Dacascos as Giyera, Garrett Hines as Hydra soldier and Brandon Ford Green as third soldier. Hines and Green did not receive guest star credit in the episode. Underwood, Zimmer, Raba, Boothe, and Dacascos reprise their roles from earlier in the series. Dillon Casey also guest stars, reprising his role as Will Daniels from "4,722 Hours".

Filming
Filming for the alien planet occurred in a work quarry in Simi Valley and in Northridge, Los Angeles near the Mojave Desert.

Music
Composer Bear McCreary worked with a larger orchestra than usual for "Maveth", a 90-piece orchestra rather than the usual 50 or 70 players required for the series. The score was recorded at the Newman Scoring Stage on the 20th Century Fox lot on the Saturday after Thanksgiving. McCreary called the episode "a crossroads between old and new storylines. At least a half dozen important musical themes were incorporated throughout the episode, including two new themes I introduced to represent new characters."

Broadcast
"Maveth" was first aired in the United States on ABC on December 8, 2015.

Reception

Ratings
In the United States the episode received a 1.3/4 percent share among adults between the ages of 18 and 49, meaning that it was seen by 1.3 percent of all households, and 4 percent of all of those watching television at the time of the broadcast. It was watched by 3.85 million viewers.

References

External links
"Maveth" at ABC

Agents of S.H.I.E.L.D. (season 3) episodes
2015 American television episodes